Feel Euphoria is the seventh studio album by American progressive rock band Spock's Beard released on July 8, 2003. It was the first album the band recorded following the departure of vocalist/songwriter Neal Morse, also the first full-length album to feature drummer Nick D'Virgilio as lead vocalist. It marked the beginning of a more band-oriented era of songwriting, as before Neal Morse had written the bulk of the band's material, now all of the remaining band members wrote for the band, including bass player Dave Meros, who picked up his first songwriting credit in the history of the band (other than full-group credits) on the song "Ghosts of Autumn".

Tracks 7 through 12 comprise the suite "A Guy Named Sid".

Track listing

Special edition bonus tracks
 "Moth of Many Flames" (Morse, Boegehold) – 2:49
 "From the Messenger" (Okumoto) – 7:25

Critical reception
With the departure of Morse, a change in sound was noted by many critics. Sea of Tranquility reported, "Two, maybe three, tracks are almost unrecognizable as Spock's Beard songs", and Sputnik Music said Morse's departure drastically affected the band's sound due to new way of writing music for the group. Proggnosis reported, "this cd should almost be addressed as an entirely different band, with the same name of course."

Personnel
Nick D'Virgilio – lead vocals, drums, acoustic & some electric guitars, percussion, loops
Alan Morse – electric and acoustic guitars, vocals
Ryo Okumoto – keyboards
Dave Meros – basses

Additional personnel
Stan Ausmus - songwriting
John Boegehold – songwriting, synths and "backward stuff" on "East of Eden, West of Memphis"
Gina Ballina – french horn
Claire Pasquale - trumpet & piccolo trumpet
Steve Velez – cello
J'Anna Jacoby – violin on "Carry On"

Production
Arranged & produced by Spock's Beard
Recorded, engineered & mixed by Richard Mouser
Mastered by Jay Frigoletto

References

2003 albums
Spock's Beard albums
Inside Out Music albums